The Wirral Country Park is a country park on the Wirral Peninsula, England, lying both in the Metropolitan Borough of Wirral in the county of Merseyside and in the borough of Cheshire West & Chester in the county of Cheshire. It was the first designated country park in Britain, opening in 1973.

The park is located along the Wirral Way, which follows the track bed of part of the former Birkenhead Railway route from West Kirby to Hooton. The route then heads inland, across the Wirral peninsula, to Hooton.

There are two visitor centres along the Wirral Way. The visitor centres are located near to the site of Thurstaston railway station, at Thurstaston, and at the preserved Hadlow Road railway station, in Willaston.

History

Work began on the park in 1969, and the park was formally opened in 1973 by Lord Leverhulme. The park's creation followed a successful campaign by Captain Lawrence Beswick DSM, which prompted the necessary investment from the Countryside Commission.

The old station platform at Thurstaston, the preserved 1950s-era railway station at Hadlow Road, Willaston, a number of bridges and the occasional railway incline signs, which indicate a degree of climb or descent, are some of the few remains of the original railway line.

Wildlife
The park is home to badgers and foxes and to ten species of butterfly identified among the local wildlife. The estuary along which the park is located is home to populations of ragworm, lugworm, and cockles which support various species of bird wildlife in the area, including common redshanks, common shelducks, northern lapwings, skylarks, meadow pipits and terns. During high spring tides visitors may also catch a glimpse of certain birds of prey such as peregrines, hen harriers and the daytime hunting short-eared owls.

Sports
Wirral Country Park is very popular with ramblers and offers numerous walks, three being of particular note. Firstly is the stretch of shoreline running a couple of miles from Thurstaston Beach to Heswall Beach, a popular route for horse riders as well. Secondly is The Wirral Way, a walk  in length that starts in West Kirby at the top end and runs down to Hooton at the other end.  The country park itself lies along the Wirral Way towards the middle of this route. Thirdly is the  circular Heswall Dales and fields walk, via a small valley known as 'The Dungeon'.

A well known route within Merseyside, with part of it running through Wirral Country Park and encompassing some of the aforementioned walks, is the Wirral Coastal Walk. It is organised as an annual event by the Rotary Club, with over 5,000 taking part in 2008. The annual event has become a popular way for local charities and organisations to raise money for their cause.

Wirral Country Park is popular not only for its wildlife and country walking, but also cycling, horse riding, kite flying, quad biking and paragliding. The  Wirral Way is very popular with cyclists, especially at weekends. Part of the Wirral Endurance Ride, a horse-riding event in the Endurance GB National Championship, is held along the Wirral Way.

Gallery

See also
 List of rail trails
 List of recreational walks in Cheshire

References

Further reading

External links

 Metropolitan Borough of Wirral: Wirral Country Park
 Discover Cheshire: Wirral Country Park
 Your West Cheshire: Wirral Country Park
 Wirral Footpaths and Open Spaces Preservation Society
 Visiting Thurstaston
 The Wirral Coastal Walk

Parks and commons in the Metropolitan Borough of Wirral
Country parks in Cheshire
Country parks in Merseyside
Rail trails in England